Ahmed Kantari (born 28 June 1985) is a former professional footballer who played as a defender. Born in France, he represented Morocco at international level. He currently serves as an assistant coach at Qatar Stars League club Al Duhail.

Club career
After a ten-year career playing in France with various clubs, Kantari signed with Toronto FC in Major League Soccer.

He was released by Toronto on 13 January 2016.

In late January 2019, at the age of 33, Kantari ended his professional career.

International career
Kantari played for Morocco participating in the 2012 Africa Cup of Nations qualification.

References

External links
 
 
 

1985 births
Living people
Sportspeople from Blois
Association football central defenders
French footballers
Moroccan footballers
Moroccan expatriate footballers
Morocco international footballers
Paris Saint-Germain F.C. players
RC Strasbourg Alsace players
Stade Brestois 29 players
RC Lens players
Toronto FC players
Valenciennes FC players
Ligue 1 players
Ligue 2 players
Major League Soccer players
French sportspeople of Moroccan descent
2012 Africa Cup of Nations players
2013 Africa Cup of Nations players
Morocco under-20 international footballers
Expatriate soccer players in Canada
Nottingham Forest F.C. non-playing staff
Footballers from Centre-Val de Loire